Beyali Khanali oghlu Atashov   is the vice president for Academic Affairs at Azerbaijan Cooperation University.

References

21st-century Azerbaijani economists
1946 births
Living people